Spectacle Island is a  island in south-eastern Australia.  It is part of the Sloping Island Group, lying close to the south-eastern coast of Tasmania around the Tasman and Forestier Peninsulas.  Recorded breeding seabird and wader species are little penguin, short-tailed shearwater and pied oystercatcher.

References

Sloping Island Group